Ménetreuil is a commune in the Saône-et-Loire department in the region of Bourgogne-Franche-Comté in eastern France.

Geography
The Sâne Morte forms most of the commune's northern border, flows southwest through the western part of the commune, then flows into the Sâne Vive, which forms the commune's southwestern border.

See also
Communes of the Saône-et-Loire department

References

Communes of Saône-et-Loire